The 2004 Conference USA men's soccer tournament was the tenth edition of the Conference USA Men's Soccer Tournament. The tournament decided the Conference USA champion and guaranteed representative into the 2004 NCAA Division I Men's Soccer Championship. The tournament was hosted by the University of Louisville and the games were played at Cardinal Park Stadium.

Bracket

Awards

All-Tournament team
Josh Beachem, Charlotte
John Nabers, Charlotte
Daniel Dobson, Memphis
Justin Dyer, Memphis
Marcus McCarty, Memphis
John Reilly, Memphis
Brett Branan, Saint Louis
Alex Matteson, Saint Louis
Sandy Gbandi, UAB
Jason McLaughlin, UAB
Rogerio Oliveira, UAB

References

External links
 

Conference USA Men's Soccer Tournament
Tournament
Conference USA Men's Soccer Tournament
Conference USA Men's Soccer Tournament